Hal Perry may refer to:

 Hal Perry (basketball) (1933–2009), American basketball player
 Hal Perry (politician), Canadian politician

See also
Harold Perry (disambiguation)
Harry Perry (disambiguation)